David Hannay (23 June 1939 – 31 March 2014) was a New Zealand Australian film producer. He worked with Greater Union and was an independent producer from 1977.

Biography
Hannay was born in Wellington and attended Scots College.  His first job in the industry was as an extras casting assistant for film  Summer of the Seventeenth Doll. Hannay produced his first feature film The Set in 1968 and then moved to television and became head of production for Gemini Productions from 1970–73 and 1975–76. In 1974 he was general manager for The Movie Company, a production subsidiary of Greater Union. From 1977 he was an independent producer and was involved in almost 50 film projects including cult classics Stone (1974) and The Man From Hong Kong (1975), Human Rights Australia Film Award winner Mapantsula (1998), Naomi Watts' first feature film Gross Misconduct (1993) and family film Hildegarde (2001) which starred Richard E. Grant and Tom Long.

Hannay was passionate about encouraging new talent as an educator and mentor and across his career worked with many writers, producers and directors on their first feature films. In November 2012 Hannay established the Bathurst Film Factory co-operative to foster the filmmaker talent in the area.

He was diagnosed with cancer in March 2012, and died in March 2014.<ref name=sbs-obit>Vale David Hannay", SBS, 2 April 2014. Retrieved 1 June 2014</ref> An obituary described him as "one of the pioneers of the modern Australian film industry, a passionate cinephile, mentor and loyal friend."

Personal life
Hannay was married to fellow New Zealander Kathleen Bourke and they had one son (Antony Darton Hannay) before separating. Hannay then met Australian journalist Mary Moody and they had three children together (Miriam, Aaron and Ethan).

Hannay's brother Charles Hannah entered the film industry in 1984 after a successful career as an international corporate executive and restauranter. 
David, Charles and sister Gillian are the children of theatre actress and writer Mary Stuart (Hannah) and theatre and radio actor-producer-director Norman Hannah."Australian Perspectives March and April screens Bruce Petty and David Hannay" , at Australian Centre for the Moving Image (ACMI), 4 February 2013, accessed 1 June 2014

Select creditsThe Set (1968)Kung Fu Killers (1974) – Co-producerStone (1974)The Man from Hong Kong (1975)Solo (1977)Alison's Birthday (1981)Emma's War (1986)Death of a Soldier (1986)Comrades (1986) – Associate ProducerOut of the Body (1988)To Make a Killing (1988)Kadaicha (1988)Mapantsula (1988)The Returning (1990)Gross Misconduct (1993)Shotgun Wedding (1993)Dead Funny (1994) – ProducerSavage Play (1995) – ProducerDags (1998) – Executive ProducerCubbyhouse (2001)Hildegarde (2001) – ProducerA Divided Heart (2005) – ProducerMortal Fools (2008) – Executive Producer Ten Dead Men (2008) – Executive Producer The Argues (2010) – Producer Once Around the Sun'' (2012) – Executive Producer

Awards
1998 – Human Rights Australia Film Award for Mapantsula
1996 – Producers and Directors Guild of Australia Lifetime Achievement Award
1996 – Named Film Pioneer of the Year by The Society of Australian Cinema Pioneers 'for outstanding service to the Motion Picture Industry'
2002 – Screen Producers Association Maura Fay Award 'for service to the industry'
2007 – AFI Raymond Longford Award 'for lifetime achievement'
2008 – Australian Screen Sound Guild's Syd Butterworth Lifetime Achievement Award
2009 – Life membership of Screen Producers Association of Australia 'for long and outstanding service to the industry of Australian Screen Production'
2011 – National Film and Sound Archive's Ken G Hall Film Preservation Award 'for outstanding contribution to the art of the moving image and its preservation'

External links

NFSA Honours David Hannay
Producer David Hannay at NZ On Screen
David Hannay at Fandango
 at Participate Film Academy
Local Stars: The silver screen appearances of the Blue Mountains

Interviews
David Hannay Interview at SoundCloud
An Interview with David Hannay (Part 1) at A Girl and a Gun
An Interview with David Hannay (Part 2) at A Girl and a Gun
Mapantsula: David Hannay
David Hannay talks about creating films
David Hannay talks about funding
The Argues Movie – The David Hannay Interview with Barry Crocker
2007 AFI Raymond Longford Award Presentation
2011 Ken G Hall Film Preservation Award Presentation

In Memoriam
Vale David Hannay at in Film
The Late Great David Hannay at Special Broadcasting Service (SBS) Movies
The Huge Heart of Horrible Hannay at Michael Burge
RIP David Hannay at FilmLink
Vale David Hannay at National Film and Sound Archive
David Hannay 1939 – 2014 at NZ filem Commission
Vale David Hannay at Innersence
The Passing of the Light at Freelance Success
RIP Australian Genre Producer David Hannay at Geek Syndicate
In Memoriam: David Hannay dies at home at Screen Arts Hub
RIP Australian Producer David Hannay
RIP David Hannay

References

Australian film producers
1939 births
2014 deaths
New Zealand emigrants to Australia